Joseph Erhardy (1928 – May 1, 2012) was an American sculptor.

Biography
Joseph Erhardy was born in Welch, West Virginia, in 1928 (as Josef Herzbrun). In 1949, in full vogue of the American abstract movement, he left his native country and went to Florence and studied classical sculpture at the Accademia di Belle Arti. In Rome, he became the assistant of Mirko Basaldella, who was himself the assistant of Arturo Martini, much admired by Joseph Erhardy. In January 1952, he came to Paris, where he has been living ever since. After an abstract period, he returned to the figure at the end of the sixties. Artistically speaking, he feels close to an international group of friends, painters and sculptors of his generation, who have been living in Paris since the 1950s, including Sam Szafran, Raymond Mason, Roseline Granet, Philippe Roman and Francois Jousselin.

Museums
 Hirshhorn Museum and Sculpture Garden Smithsonian Institution: 7th Street & Independence Ave. SW Mail to: PO Box 37012/HMSG MRC 350 Washington, DC 20013-7012
 The National Portrait Gallery (United States) 750 Ninth St., NW, Suite 8300 Washington, DC 20560-0213 (Portrait bust of John Kenneth Galbraith)
 The Corcoran Gallery of Art 500 17th Street, NW Washington, DC 20006-4804
 The Library of Congress 101 Independence Ave, SE Washington, DC 20540 (Portrait bust of Daniel Boorstin)
 MIT Museum 265 Massachusetts Avenue, MIT Bldg N52 Cambridge, MA 02139 (Low relief of Sir Robert Jackson)
 Vatican Museum The Vatican Rome, ITALY
 Pompidou Centre/Beaubourg, Paris, FRANCE
 Downing College, University of Cambridge, UK
 museum Beelden aan Zee, the Netherlands (L'Été aux Tuileries)(1955)(bronze)

Selected public works
United States
 "Warrior's Head", marble, The Corcoran Gallery of Art, Washington D.C., USA (acquired in 1962)
 "Bather" marble, "Little Flower" marble, "Little Head", marble, The Joseph H. Hishhorn Museum and Sculpture Garden, Washington D.C. (acquired in 1964)
 "John Kenneth Galbraith" marble portrait bust, The National Portrait Gallery, Washington D.C., USA (acquired in 1981)
 "Daniel Boorstin", Librarian of Congress, bronze portrait bust, The Library of Congress, Washington D.C., USA (acquired in 1983)
 "Sir Robert Jackson" low relief in bronze, Massachusetts Institute of Technology Museum, Boston, USA, (acquired in 1996)
 "Friedrich von Bischoff" bronze portrait bust, Museum of Fine Arts, Indiana University, Blooming, Indiana, USA, (acquired in 2001)

France
 "Ruth Fisher", monumental sculpture in granite- Montparnasse Cemetery (Paris) France (acquired in 1963)
 "The Sea", marble, National Museum of Modern Art, Paris, France, (acquired in 1969)
 "Crucifix", bronze, Saint Front Cathedral - Périgueux (Dordogne) (acquired in 1978)
 "Waiting", bronze, The Georges Pompidou Center (Paris) France (acquired in 1979)
 "Coming Home from Market", bronze, Prefectural Square of Cergy Pontoise (Val d'Oise), France (acquired in 1981)
 "Raymond Aron", portrait bust in marble, Foundation of French Judaism, Paris, France (acquired in 1983)
 "Jean Corvisart", monumental memorial bust in terra-cotta, Roubaix Hospital, France (acquired in 1983)
 "Épée d'Académicien" (academic sword), presented to Fernand Braudel upon his election to the French Academy in 1985
 "Madame Borochovitch", memorial portrait bust in bronze, Museum of the French Resistance Mouvement, Nantua (Ain), France (acquired in 1991)

Great-Britain
 "Nude with Drape", bronze (1957), "Girl with hair in a bun", marble (1961), "Little Girl" marble (1961), "Asleep" marble (1964), "Strife" marble (1965), "Curved" marble (1966), "Girl with an apple" marble (1970), "Motherhood" marble (1970), Downing College, University of Cambridge, Great Britain (acquired between 1961 and 1970)

Italy
 "Crucifix" bronze, The Vatican, Rome, Italy (acquired in 1979)

Netherlands
 "Double Sculpture" monumental sculpture in stone with marble inlay, "Crucifix" bronze, Catherina Hospital, Eindhoven (acquired in 1972)
 "Summer in the Tuileries Gardens" monumental sculpture in bronze, Beelden aan Zee, Museum Scheveningen, The Hague (acquired in 1998)

References
 Who's Who in France
 2005 Dunbier, Lonnie Pierson (Ed) The Artists Bluebook: 34,000 North American Artists to March 2005
 2005 Davenport, Ray Davenport's Art Reference: The Gold Edition

External links
 Joseph Erhardy official web site
 20th Century Figure sculpture

1928 births
2012 deaths
20th-century American sculptors
People from Welch, West Virginia
Artists from West Virginia
American abstract artists
21st-century American sculptors
21st-century American male artists
American male sculptors
American expatriates in France
20th-century American male artists